A Cargo to Africa is a 2009 Canadian film directed by Roger Cantin.

See also
 Cinema of Quebec
 Cinema of Canada

External links
 

2009 films
Canadian comedy-drama films
Films set in Montreal
Films shot in Montreal
Quebec films
2009 comedy-drama films
French-language Canadian films
2000s English-language films
2000s Canadian films